Monaco is a small suburb of Nelson, New Zealand, west of town centre of Stoke. It lies on a narrow peninsula which extends into Tasman Bay / Te Tai-o-Aorere immediately to the south of Nelson Airport, southwest of central Nelson.

The Broadgreen-Monaco statistical area, as defined by Statistics New Zealand, covers a land area of 1.14 km², including the peninsula.

History

The estimated population of the area was 2,160 in 1996.

It reached 2,190 in 2001 and 2,298 in 2006, held steady at 2,298 in 2013, and then rose to 2,376 in 2018.

Demography

Broadgreen-Monaco had a population of 2,376 at the 2018 New Zealand census, an increase of 78 people (3.4%) since the 2013 census, and an increase of 78 people (3.4%) since the 2006 census. There were 927 households. There were 1,122 males and 1,254 females, giving a sex ratio of 0.89 males per female. The median age was 44.2 years (compared with 37.4 years nationally), with 435 people (18.3%) aged under 15 years, 387 (16.3%) aged 15 to 29, 1,065 (44.8%) aged 30 to 64, and 489 (20.6%) aged 65 or older.

Ethnicities were 89.9% European/Pākehā, 10.6% Māori, 2.7% Pacific peoples, 3.7% Asian, and 1.8% other ethnicities (totals add to more than 100% since people could identify with multiple ethnicities).

The proportion of people born overseas was 17.9%, compared with 27.1% nationally.

Although some people objected to giving their religion, 53.4% had no religion, 35.1% were Christian, 0.3% were Hindu, 0.4% were Buddhist and 3.0% had other religions.

Of those at least 15 years old, 264 (13.6%) people had a bachelor or higher degree, and 435 (22.4%) people had no formal qualifications. The median income was $27,500, compared with $31,800 nationally. The employment status of those at least 15 was that 885 (45.6%) people were employed full-time, 324 (16.7%) were part-time, and 57 (2.9%) were unemployed.

Economy

In 2018, 12.7% worked in manufacturing, 9.2% worked in construction, 6.2% worked in hospitality, 6.2% worked in transport, 9.2% worked in education, and 12.2% worked in healthcare.

Transport

As of 2018, among those who commuted to work, 71.6% drove a car, 3.8% rode in a car, 2.4% use a bike, and 2.4% walk or run.

No one used public transport.

Education

Birchwood School is a co-educational state primary school for Year 1 to 6 students.

References

Suburbs of Nelson, New Zealand
Populated places in the Nelson Region
Populated places around Tasman Bay / Te Tai-o-Aorere